Christopher Aubrey  (born 16 December 1991 from Swindon, Wiltshire) is a former English professional darts player who competes in the Professional Darts Corporation events.

Career

Aubrey reached the first final of his career in 2011 at the fourth PDC Youth Tour event where he lost 4–2 against Paul Barham. He progressed to the quarter-finals of a main PDC event for the first time later in the year at a Players Championship event in Germany with wins over the likes of 1996 BDO world champion Steve Beaton and his travelling partner Dennis Smith, before being beaten 6–2 by Colin Osborne. In 2012, Aubrey won his first and to date only tournament as he beat Jamie Lewis 4–3 to claim a Youth Tour title in Germany. 

Aubrey qualified for his first PDC major at the 2014 UK Open, but lost 5–3 to Lionel Sams in the first round. He also played in the European Darts Open and European Darts Grand Prix, losing in the first round to Jamie Lewis and Michael Rosenauer respectively. Aubrey qualified for the 2015 German Darts Championship, but lost 6–2 to John Bowles in the first round. His year was mainly concentrated around Challenge Tour and Development Tour events. He reached the semi-finals of the seventh Challenge Tour event where he was beaten 5–2 by Shaun Griffiths. Aubrey has not played in an event since the end of 2015.

References

External links

Living people
Professional Darts Corporation former tour card holders
English darts players
1991 births
Sportspeople from Swindon